Uttara Devi (Princess/Queen of the North ) is an Intercity Express train that runs between Colombo, the nation's commercial hub, with the northern cities of Jaffna and Kankesanturai.

History 
The Uttara Devi train was introduced as Deyata Kirula on 11 September 2011. Then its name was changed to Uttara Devi in mid-2015.

Services 
The Uttara Devi offers three classes of travel.
1st class offers Air conditioning and charging facilities. 
2nd class.
3rd class typically gets very crowded and carries only basic facilities.

Route 
The train begins its northbound journey at Colombo Fort. It stops only at Gampaha, then reaches Polgahawela, the train branches off the Main Line, moving towards Kankesanturai, following Northern Line. It passes Kurunegala, the capital of North Western Province, and Maho, before continuing to the historic cultural and religious center of Anuradhapura, the island's ancient capital around the 4th century BCE and home to many sites of religious and archaeological interest. The train continues towards Jaffna, passing Vavuniya, Kilinochchi, Palai and Kodikamamam. Jaffna is the main cultural centre of the north of Sri Lanka. From here, the Northern Line extended to Kankesanturai, a port city. From Jaffna to Kankesanturai, Uttara Devi stops at every station.

Rolling Stock

The service was run  by S11 DMU, but was replaced by the new S13 sets in January 2019.

See also 
Sri Lanka Railways
List of named passenger trains of Sri Lanka

References

External links 
 Uthuru Mithuru: Rebuilding the Yal Devi Friendship Track

Named passenger trains of Sri Lanka
Rail transport in Northern Province, Sri Lanka